Fernando Andrés Prado Avelino (born 21 March 2001) is a Uruguayan professional footballer who plays as a left-back or centre-back for Racing Club.

Career
Born in Uruguay, Prado ended up in the youth system of Racing Club in Argentina. He made the jump into their first-team squad in November 2020. Prado made his senior debut in the Copa de la Liga Profesional on 19 November, featuring for the full duration of a loss away to Atlético Tucumán; compatriot Fabricio Domínguez also debuted for the club that day.

Career statistics
.

Notes

References

External links

2001 births
Living people
People from Carmelo, Uruguay
Uruguayan footballers
Association football defenders
Racing Club de Avellaneda footballers